The 1973 elections to the Northern Ireland Assembly took place following the publication of the British government's white paper Northern Ireland Constitutional Proposals which proposed a 78-member Northern Ireland Assembly, elected by proportional representation. The proposals for a Northern Ireland Assembly contained in the White Paper were put into effect through the  Northern Ireland Assembly Act 1973 in May 1973.

A cross-community coalition of the Ulster Unionist Party (UUP) under Brian Faulkner, the Social Democratic and Labour Party (SDLP) and the Alliance Party of Northern Ireland was agreed in November, and following the Sunningdale Agreement, a Power Sharing Executive was established from 1 January 1974.  After opposition from within the UUP and the Ulster Workers Council Strike, the executive and assembly collapsed in May 1974.

Result
The election results were:

All parties listed.

Votes summary

Seats summary

See also
Members of the Northern Ireland Assembly elected in 1973

References

Footnotes

Sources
 http://www.ark.ac.uk/elections/fa73.htm

Northern Ireland Assembly (1973)
1973 elections in the United Kingdom
1973
June 1973 events in the United Kingdom
1973 elections in Northern Ireland